Dollar Lake is a lake along the main branch of the Clinton River. The lake lies within Independence Township in Oakland County, Michigan.

Dollar Lake connects upstream with Middle  Lake to the north and downstream (under a bridge over Dixie Highway) with Greens Lake to the west.

Name
Dollar Lake was named so because it was shaped round like a silver dollar.

Fish
Dollar Lake fish include Largemouth Bass, Bluegill and Perch.

References

Lakes of Oakland County, Michigan
Lakes of Michigan
Lakes of Independence Township, Michigan